The Denizli Gondola is a two-station aerial lift line of gondola type in Denizli, Turkey. It is owned and operated by Denizli Metropolitan Municipality. It operates between Denizli and Bağbaşı Hill.

It was opened on 17 October 2015, with a ceremony attended by Nihat Zeybekci, then-Minister of the Economy and former Mayor of Denizli, and Yalçın Topçu, then-Minister of Culture and Tourism. The construction cost was 38 million TRY (approximately 13 million USD).

Bağbaşı Hill, the upper station, has bungalow cabins to rent overnight, tents to stay in, play areas, activity park built in the forest trees with climbing and rope obstacles, shop huts, cafés and restaurants. The round-trip ticket for the ride costs 20.00.

See also
 List of gondola lifts in Turkey

References

Gondola lifts in Turkey
2015 establishments in Turkey
Transport infrastructure completed in 2015
Tourist attractions in Denizli Province
Buildings and structures in Denizli
Denizli